Barbarka refers to the following places in Poland:

 Barbarka, Greater Poland Voivodeship
 Barbarka, Lesser Poland Voivodeship